Keningau Murut, or Central Murut, is a language spoken by the Murut people of Borneo.

References

Murutic languages
Endangered Austronesian languages
Languages of Malaysia